Tracy G. Gallagher is an American journalist and the anchor of Fox News @ Night, Fox News' late-night news program.

Background
Gallagher grew up in the ski resort town of Mammoth Lakes, California where he was the quarterback for the Mammoth Huskies football team. He graduated from high school in 1979. Gallagher studied at the University of San Diego and he majored in business playing quarterback for the Torero football team.

Fox News
Based in Los Angeles, Gallagher served as a co-anchor (with Martha MacCallum) of The Live Desk and as a substitute anchor for Studio B with Shepard Smith and Fox Report. During his time at Fox Gallagher has reported on the Space Shuttle Columbia disaster and the 2004 Southeast Asian tsunami. Gallagher has also served as a general assignment correspondent.

He has worked at Fox's Chicago, San Francisco, and New York City news bureaus. Previously Gallagher worked at WCPX (now WKMG) in Orlando, KVBC (now KSNV) in Las Vegas, and KTVB in Boise.

On February 1, 2010, The Live Desk was replaced with America Live with Megyn Kelly. Gallagher continues to anchor and report on Fox programs.

On September 21, 2022, he was named permanent host of Fox News @ Night, replacing founding host Shannon Bream after she was named host of Fox News Sunday. He has been hosting the program since October 3, 2022.

References

External links
 FoxNews website
 

Living people
American male journalists
American television journalists
Fox News people
Journalists from Arizona
Journalists from California
Journalists from Idaho
Journalists from Illinois
Journalists from Las Vegas
Television anchors from Orlando, Florida
People from Greater Los Angeles
People from Mammoth Lakes, California
People from San Diego
Television personalities from California
University of San Diego alumni
1961 births